George Pindar School is a coeducational secondary school in Eastfield, Scarborough in North Yorkshire, England. It was previously named George Pindar Community Sports College (GPCSC), but during 2012 the school reverted to its original name.

History 
The school was founded in 1900.

In June 2019 the school was taken over by Hope Learning Academy and is now registered as an academy.

Notable alumni

Mikey North, (actor)
Danny Price, (cruiserweight boxer)
Darren Wood, (footballer)

References

External links
 School web site
 GOV.UK information
 Ofsted reports

Schools in Scarborough, North Yorkshire
Secondary schools in North Yorkshire
Academies in North Yorkshire
1900 establishments in England
Educational institutions established in 1900